The 2013 Nürnberger Versicherungscup was a professional tennis tournament played on clay courts. It was the first edition of the tournament which was part of the 2013 WTA Tour. It took place in Nuremberg, Germany, on 10–15 June 2013.

Singles main draw entrants

Seeds 

 1 Rankings as of 27 May 2013

Other entrants 
The following players received wildcards into the singles main draw:
  Jelena Janković
  Andrea Petkovic
  Dinah Pfizenmaier

The following players received entry from the qualifying draw:
  Tereza Martincová
  Grace Min
  Alexandra Panova
  Tereza Smitková

The following player received entry as a lucky loser:
  Yuliya Beygelzimer

Withdrawals 
Before the tournament
  Irina-Camelia Begu
  Lucie Hradecká
  Bethanie Mattek-Sands
  Anabel Medina Garrigues
  Monica Niculescu
  Flavia Pennetta (leg injury)
  Chanelle Scheepers
  Yaroslava Shvedova
  Silvia Soler Espinosa
  Carla Suárez Navarro

Doubles main draw entrants

Seeds 

1 Rankings as of 27 May 2013

Other entrants 
The following pairs received wildcards into the doubles main draw:
  Kristina Barrois /  Anna-Lena Friedsam
  Laura Siegemund /  Nina Zander

Champions

Singles 

  Simona Halep defeated  Andrea Petkovic, 6–3, 6–3

Doubles 

  Raluca Olaru /  Valeria Solovyeva defeated  Anna-Lena Grönefeld /  Květa Peschke, 2–6, 7–6(7–3), [11–9]

External links 
 

2013 WTA Tour
2013
2013 in German tennis